Nicholas Ray (born Raymond Nicholas Kienzle Jr., August 7, 1911 – June 16, 1979) was an American film director, screenwriter, and actor best known for the 1955 film Rebel Without a Cause. He is appreciated for many narrative features produced between 1947 and 1963 including They Live By Night (1948), In A Lonely Place (1950), Johnny Guitar (1954), Rebel Without a Cause (1955), and Bigger Than Life (1956), as well as an experimental work produced throughout the 1970s titled We Can't Go Home Again, which was unfinished at the time of Ray's death.

Ray's compositions within the CinemaScope frame and use of color are particularly well-regarded and he was an important influence on the French New Wave, with Jean-Luc Godard famously writing in a review of Bitter Victory, "... there is cinema.  And the cinema is Nicholas Ray."

Early life and career
Ray was born in Galesville, Wisconsin, the youngest of four children and only son of Olene "Lena" (Toppen) and Raymond Nicholas Kienzle, a contractor and builder. His paternal grandparents were German and his maternal grandparents were Norwegian. He grew up in La Crosse, Wisconsin, also the home town of future fellow director Joseph Losey.  A popular but erratic student prone to delinquency and alcohol abuse, with his alcoholic father as an example, at age sixteen Ray was sent to live with his older, married sister in Chicago, Illinois, where he attended Waller High School and immersed himself in the Al Capone-era nightlife. Upon his return to La Crosse in his senior year, he emerged as a talented orator, winning a contest at local radio station WKBH (now WIZM) while also hanging around a local stock theater.

With strong grades in English and public speaking and failures in Latin, physics, and geometry, he graduated at the bottom (ranked 152nd in a class of 153) of his class at La Crosse Central High School in 1929. He studied drama at La Crosse State Teachers College (now the University of Wisconsin–La Crosse) for two years before earning the requisite grades to apply for admission to the University of Chicago in the fall of 1931. Although he spent only one semester at the institution because of excessive drinking and poor grades, Ray managed to cultivate a relationship with dramatist Thornton Wilder, then a professor.

Having been active in the Student Dramatic Association during his time in Chicago, Ray returned to his hometown and started the La Crosse Little Theatre Group, which presented several productions in 1932. He also briefly re-enrolled at the State Teachers College in the fall of that year. Before his stint at Chicago, he had contributed a regular column of musings, called "The Bullshevist," to the Racquet, the college's weekly publication, and resumed writing for it when he returned, but, according to biographer Patrick McGilligan, Ray, with friend Clarence Hiskey, also arranged meetings to organize a La Crosse chapter of the Communist Party USA. By early 1933, he had left the State Teachers College and began to employ the moniker of "Nicholas Ray" in his correspondence.

Through his connections with Thornton Wilder and others in Chicago, Ray met Frank Lloyd Wright at Wright's home, Taliesin, in Spring Green, Wisconsin. He cultivated a relationship with Wright in order to win an invitation to join "the Fellowship," as the community of Wright "apprentices" was known.  In late 1933 Wright asked Ray to organize the newly built Hillside Playhouse, a room at Taliesin dedicated to  musical and dramatic performances. There, at regular film screenings often encompassing foreign productions, Ray likely had his first exposure to non-Hollywood cinema. However he and his mentor had a falling-out in spring 1934 with Wright directing him to leave the compound immediately.

While negotiating with Wright, Ray visited New York City, where he had his first encounters with the political theatre growing in response to the Great Depression. Returning after his ejection from Taliesin, Ray joined the Workers' Laboratory Theatre, a communal troupe formed in 1929, which had recently changed its name to the Theatre of Action. Briefly billing himself as Nik Ray, he acted in several productions, collaborating with a number of performers, some of whom he later cast in his films, including Will Lee and Curt Conway, and some who became friends for life, including Elia Kazan.  He was subsequently employed by the Federal Theatre Project, part of the Works Progress Administration. He befriended folklorist Alan Lomax and traveled with him through rural America, collecting traditional vernacular music. In 1940–41, Lomax produced and Ray directed Back Where I Come From, a pioneering folk music radio program featuring such artists as Woody Guthrie, Burl Ives, Lead Belly, the Golden Gate Quartet, and Pete Seeger, for CBS. American folk songs would later figure prominently in several of his films.

During the early years of World War II, Ray directed and supervised radio propaganda programs for the United States Office of War Information and the Voice of America broadcasting service under the aegis of John Houseman. In the summer of 1942 Ray was investigated by the FBI, and was given its B-2 classification of "tentative dangerousness." Additionally, Director J. Edgar Hoover personally recommended "Custodial Detention." Though Hoover's scheme was later quashed by the Justice Department, in autumn 1943 Ray was among more than twenty OWI employees identified publicly as having Communist affiliations or sympathies, noting that he was "discharged from the WPA community service of Washington DC for Communist activities."  The FBI soon determined the case of "Nicholas K. Ray," however, "as not warranting investigation."  At the OWI, Ray renewed his acquaintance with Molly Day Thatcher, Houseman's assistant, and her husband, Elia Kazan, from the New York theatre days. In 1944, heading to Hollywood to direct A Tree Grows in Brooklyn, Kazan suggested Ray go west, too, and hired him as an assistant on the production.

Returning east, Ray directed his first and only Broadway production, the Duke Ellington-John Latouche musical Beggar's Holiday, in 1946. Earlier that year he was assistant director, under director Houseman, of another Broadway musical, Lute Song, with music by Raymond Scott. Also through Houseman, Ray had the opportunity to work in television, one of his few forays into the new medium. Houseman had agreed to direct an adaption of Lucille Fletcher's radio thriller, Sorry, Wrong Number, for CBS, and took Ray on as his collaborator. They cast Mildred Natwick as the invalid woman who thinks that she's the object of a murder scheme she overhears on her phone. When Lute Song called on Houseman's time and attention, Ray took over the task of staging the broadcast, which aired on January 30, 1946. The next year, Ray directed his first film, They Live by Night (1949), for RKO Pictures.

Hollywood 
They Live By Night was reviewed (under one of its working titles, The Twisted Road) as early as June 1948, but not released until November 1949, due to the chaotic conditions surrounding Howard Hughes's takeover of RKO Pictures.  As a result of the delay, the second and third pictures Ray directed, RKO's A Woman's Secret (1949) and Knock On Any Door (1949), a loan-out to Humphrey Bogart's Santana Productions and Columbia, were released before his first.

Almost an impressionistic take on film noir, starring Farley Granger and Cathy O'Donnell as a thief and his newlywed wife, They Live By Night was notable for its empathy for society's young outsiders, a recurring motif in Ray's oeuvre. Its subject matter, two young lovers running from the law, had an influence on the sporadically popular movie subgenre involving a fugitive criminal couple, including Joseph H. Lewis's Gun Crazy (1950), Arthur Penn's Bonnie and Clyde (1967), Terrence Malick's Badlands (1973), and Robert Altman's 1974 adaptation of the Edward Anderson novel that had also served as the basis for Ray's film, Thieves Like Us.

The New York Times gave They Live By Night a positive review (despite calling his trademark sympathetic eye to rebels and criminals "misguided") and acclaimed Ray for "good, realistic production and sharp direction...Mr. Ray has an eye for action details. His staging of the robbery of a bank, all seen by the lad in the pick-up car, makes a fine clip of agitating film. And his sensitive juxtaposing of his actors against highways, tourist camps and bleak motels makes for a vivid comprehension of an intimate personal drama in hopeless flight."

Ray made several more contributions to the noir genre, most notably the 1950 Humphrey Bogart movie, also for Santana and released by Columbia, In a Lonely Place, about a troubled screenwriter suspected of a violent murder, and On Dangerous Ground (1951), in which Robert Ryan plays an alienated, brutally violent detective on a city police force who finds redemption, and love, after he is sent to investigate a murder in a rural community.

While at RKO, Ray also directed A Woman's Secret, co-starring his wife-to-be Gloria Grahame as a singer who becomes the subject of a crime and an investigation of her past, and Born to Be Bad (1950), with Joan Fontaine as a San Francisco social climber.

In January 1949, Ray was announced as set to direct I Married a Communist, a litmus test that RKO head Howard Hughes had concocted to weed out Communists at the studio.  John Cromwell and Joseph Losey had previously turned it down, and both were punished by the studio and subsequently blacklisted.  Soon after the public announcement, and prior to the start of production, Ray stepped away from the project.  While the studio considered dismissing him or suspending him, instead it extended his contract, evidently with Hughes's consent.  As late as 1979, Ray insisted that Hughes "saved me from blacklisting," although Ray also likely wrote to the House Committee on Un-American Activities about his political past or testified in private, in order to protect himself.

His final film at the studio, The Lusty Men (1952), starred Robert Mitchum as a champion bronco rider who tutors a younger man in the ways of rodeoing while becoming emotionally involved with the younger cowpoke's wife.  At a March 1979 college appearance documented in the first sequence of Lightning Over Water (1980) to be shot, Ray talks about The Lusty Men as a film about "a man who wants to bring himself all together before he dies."

After leaving RKO, Ray signed with a new agent, MCA's Lew Wasserman, a major Hollywood force, who steered the director's career through the 1950s.  During that time, Ray directed one or two films for most of the major studios, and one generally considered to be a minor, Republic Pictures.  He made films in conventionalized genres, including Westerns and melodramas, as well as others that resisted easy categorization.

In the mid-fifties he made the two films for which he is best remembered: Johnny Guitar (1954)  and Rebel Without a Cause (1955). The former, made at Republic, was a Western starring Joan Crawford and Mercedes McCambridge in action roles of the kind customarily played by men. Stylized, and highly eccentric in its time, it was much loved by French critics. (François Truffaut called it "the Beauty and the Beast of Westerns, a Western dream.")

Between feature-length projects, and after shooting another Western, Run For Cover (1955), starring James Cagney, Ray was asked to take on a television film for G. E. Theater.  The anthology series was produced by MCA-Revue, a subsidiary of the agency to which the director was signed, and aired on CBS.  High Green Wall was an adaptation, by Charles Jackson, of an Evelyn Waugh story, "The Man Who Liked Dickens," about an illiterate man, played by Thomas Gomez, who holds captive a stranded traveller, played by Joseph Cotten, in the jungle, forcing him to read aloud from Dickens novels.  Shot on film over a few days, after a week's rehearsal, the half-hour drama was broadcast on October 3, 1954.  Ray did not work in broadcast television after, and rarely spoke of the program, later expressing his disappointment: "I was hoping for something new, accidental or planned, to happen.  But it didn't."

In 1955, at Warner Bros., Ray directed Rebel Without a Cause, twenty-four hours in the life of a troubled teenager, starring James Dean in what proved to be his most famous role. When Rebel was released, only a few weeks after Dean's early death in an automobile crash, it had a revolutionary impact on movie-making and youth culture, virtually giving birth to the contemporary concept of the American teenager. Looking past its social and pop-culture significance, Rebel Without a Cause is the purest example of Ray's cinematic style and vision, with an expressionistic use of colour, dramatic use of architecture, and an empathy for social misfits.

Rebel Without a Cause was Ray's biggest commercial success, and marked a breakthrough in the careers of child actors Natalie Wood and Sal Mineo. Ray engaged in a tempestuous "spiritual marriage" with Dean, and awakened the latent homosexuality of Mineo, through his role as Plato, who would become the first gay teenager to appear on film. During filming Ray began a short-lived affair with Wood, who, at age 16, was 27 years his junior. This created a tense atmosphere between Ray and Dennis Hopper, who was also involved with Wood at the time, but they were reconciled later.

In 1956, Ray was chosen to direct the melodrama Bigger Than Life at Twentieth Century-Fox by the film's star and producer, James Mason, who played an elementary-school teacher, stricken with a rare circulatory ailment, and driven delusional by his abuse of a new wonder drug, Cortisone. In 1957, completing a two-picture deal, Ray reluctantly directed The True Story of Jesse James, a remake of the 1939 Fox release, Jesse James.  Ray wanted to cast Elvis Presley as the legendary bandit, and Presley had made his first film, Love Me Tender (1956), at the studio.  Fox demurred, however, and Presley moved to Paramount, leaving contract players Robert Wagner and Jeffrey Hunter to play the James brothers.

Warner's commitment to Rebel Without a Cause led the studio to send Ray on his first overseas trip, in September 1955, to publicize the film, while it was still in previews in the US.  He visited Paris, where he met some of the French critics, eager to talk with the director of Johnny Guitar, one of whom, he later remarked, "almost persuaded me it was a great movie." He was in London when he received the call telling him of James Dean's death, on the last day of the month, and then travelled to Germany, to drink and mourn. Nonetheless, this moment marked a professional change for Ray, most of whose remaining mainstream films were produced outside Hollywood.  He returned to Warner Bros. for Wind Across the Everglades (1958), an ecologically themed period drama about plume poachers, written by Budd Schulberg and produced by his brother, Stuart Schulberg, and at MGM he directed Party Girl (1958), which harked back to Ray's youth in Chicago, a Roaring Twenties gangster drama that included musical numbers performed by star Cyd Charisse.

Prior to those projects, however, Ray returned to France to direct Bitter Victory (1957), a World War II drama starring Richard Burton and Curd Jürgens as Leith and Brand, British army officers on a mission to raid a Nazi station in Benghazi, and Ruth Roman as Brand's wife and, before the war, Leith's lover.  Shot on location in the Libyan desert, with some sequences in a studio in Nice, it was by all accounts an arduous production, exacerbated for Ray by his drinking and drug use.  As much an art film as a conventional war picture, Bitter Victory confused many while enthusing Ray's continental supporters, such as Godard and Éric Rohmer.

While for the first decade of his career Ray's films had been studio pictures, and relatively small in scale, by the late 1950s, they were increasing in logistical complexity and difficulty, and cost.  As well, the studio system that had both challenged and supported him was changing, making Hollywood less viable for him as a professional base.

Though he contributed to the writing of most of his films—perhaps most extensively The Lusty Men, which started production with only a handful of pages—The Savage Innocents (1960) was the only screenplay of a film he directed for which he received credit.  Adapting a novel about Inuit life by Hans Ruesch, Top of the World, Ray also drew on the writing of explorer Peter Freuchen, and the 1933 film based on one of Freuchen's books, Eskimo.  An epic-scale production, with Italian backing and distribution by Paramount, Ray began shooting the film, with lead Anthony Quinn, in the brutal cold of northern Manitoba and on Baffin Island, but much of the footage was lost in a plane crash.  He had to use process photography to replace the lost location scenes, when the production moved to Rome, as planned, for studio work.

Now largely based in Europe, Ray signed on to direct producer Samuel Bronston's life of Christ as a replacement for the original director, John Farrow.  Shooting in Spain, Ray cast Jeffrey Hunter, who had played Jesse James's brother Frank for the director a few years before, as Jesus.  A vast undertaking by any account, the production endured intervention by backing studio MGM, logistical challenges (the Sermon on the Mount sequence required five cameras and employed 5,400 extras), and the project grew in ways that Ray was not strong enough to control.  Perhaps predictably, King of Kings (1961) was received with hostility by the US press, the Catholic periodical America, in a review titled "Christ or Credit Card?" calling it "disedifying and antireligious."

Screenwriter Philip Yordan, Ray's collaborator on several projects, back to Johnny Guitar and including King of Kings, looking at an extremely lucrative prospect, persuaded the director to sign again with Bronston for another epic, this one about the Boxer Rebellion.  As biographer Bernard Eisenschitz observes, "Accounts of Ray during the making of 55 Days at Peking portray, not a man who was drinking (the rationale often advanced), but a film-maker who couldn't make up his mind, seeking refuge in frenzied activity and loading himself with unnecessary burdens."  With an international cast, including Charlton Heston, Ava Gardner, David Niven, and most of the staff of Madrid's Chinese restaurants (as extras, not the Chinese principals), again for Ray, the project was being rewritten on the fly, and he was directing with little preparation.  By habit and because of the pressures of the job, he was heavily medicated and slept little, and finally, he collapsed on the set, according to his wife suffering a tachycardia.  He was replaced by Andrew Marton, a highly regarded second-unit director fresh off another runaway spectacle, Cleopatra (1963), with some of Heston's final scenes with Gardner directed by Guy Green, at Heston's request. Released from hospital, Ray tried to participate in the editing process, but, according to Marton, "was so abusive and so critical of the first part of the picture, which was my part," that Bronston forbade Ray from viewing any more of the assembled scenes.  Though Marton estimated that sixty-five per cent of the picture was his, and though he wanted the directing credit, he accepted a financial settlement from Bronston.  Ray was credited as director, and represented the film, his last mainstream motion picture, at its May 1963 premiere in London.

Later career

Ray found himself increasingly shut out of the Hollywood film industry in the early 1960s, and after 55 Days at Peking, he did not direct again until the 1970s, though he continued to try to develop projects while in Europe.

He attempted an adaptation of Ibsen's The Lady From the Sea, first with Ingrid Bergman in mind, and later Romy Schneider.  He optioned a novel, Next Stop—Paradise, by the Polish writer Marek Hlasko.  In late 1963, in Paris, he worked with novelist James Jones on a Western titled Under Western Skies, drawing on Hamlet.

Moving to London, urged to treat his alcohol and drug abuse, he consulted the physician and psychiatrist, Barrington Cooper, who prescribed script work as "occupational therapy."  They formed a production company, Emerald Films, under which they developed two projects that were among the few in Ray's European sojourn to come anywhere near fruition.  The Doctor and the Devils was a screenplay written by Dylan Thomas (whom Cooper had also treated), inspired by the 1828 case of Dr. Robert Knox and murderers Burke and Hare, who supplied him with corpses for dissection, to be used during medical lessons.  Ray struck up a deal with Avala Film, the largest production company in Yugoslavia, to back that film and three others, leading him from London to Zagreb.  Production was announced as starting on September 1, 1965, amended to October 21, with Maximilian Schell, Susannah York, and Geraldine Chaplin in the cast, but Ray insisted on rewrites, asking, among others, John Fowles, who declined, and Gore Vidal, who in retrospect wondered why he agreed.  Ray tried in vain to enlist US investment, by Seven Arts and Warner Bros., on a budget that was mounting, to upwards of $2.5 million.  Accounts of the productions failure vary, including the assertion that on the first day of shooting, Ray was out of the country, and the conclusion that he was paralysed by doubt and indecision.  Whatever the case, prospects for a new, major Nicholas Ray film dissolved.

Dave Wallis's novel, Only Lovers Left Alive, was the second property that Ray tried to develop as an Emerald Films venture.  As a dystopian parable, in which adults have abandoned society and adolescents have formed gangs to take charge, it might have seemed perfect for the director of Rebel Without A Cause, and, announced in spring 1966,  it was to star the Rolling Stones.  According to Cooper, the Stones' US manager Allen Klein treated him and Ray to lavish visits to New York, and then Los Angeles, for meetings, then "conned" Ray into giving up his rights to the property, with a "lucrative director's contract," and evidently nothing to direct.  (Jim Jarmusch, who befriended Ray a few years before Ray died, later made a film titled Only Lovers Left Alive (2013).  The story of a young vampire couple—who of course are not young at all—its only connection with the Wallis novel or Ray's project is its title.)

While working with Dr. Cooper, and after, Ray maintained some degree of cash flow by developing and editing scripts, but for films that never came to be.  He made the German island Sylt his base of operations and imagined projects that might be shot there, including one to star Jane Fonda and Paul Newman, titled Go Where You Want, Die As You Must, a production that would also demand 2,000 extras.  While in Europe, he attracted some of the current generation of filmmakers. He had been introduced to Volker Schlöndorff by Hanne Axmann, who had starred in Schlöndorff's first film, and Ray brokered a deal to sell his second, Mord und Totschlag (1969), to Universal Pictures, pocketing about one-third of the money as his fee and for expenses. When in Paris, he sometimes stayed with Barbet Schroeder, whose production company tried to find backing for one or another of Ray's projects.  There, in the wake of the May 1968 demonstrations, he collaborated with Jean-Pierre Bastid and producer Henry Lange to shoot a three-part, one-hour film, which he later titled Wha-a-at?, one of several projects, concerning contemporary young people during a time of questioning, rebellion, and revolt, that never came to be.  Similarly, Ray enticed Schroeder's friend Stéphane Tchalgadjieff to raise funding for L'Evadé (The Substitute), a story about mixed and assumed identities, and Tchalgadjieff raised a half-million dollars, only for Ray to manoeuvre him out, and for nothing to emerge from the enterprise.

Ray's reputation for youth-oriented films led Ellen Ray (unrelated to him) and her partners in Dome Films to solicit him to direct her screenplay about a young man on trial for possession of marijuana, which became the reason for Ray's return to the United States in November 1969.  Instead of The Defendant, however, Ray embarked on projects concerning young Americans in turbulent times, notably the Chicago Seven, forming a production company called Leo Seven, and drawing some financial interest from Michael Butler, producer of the hit stage musical Hair.  Shooting material for Conspiracy on almost every current gauge of film stock, from 35mm to Super 8, he accumulated documentary sequences, dramatized reconstructions of the trial, and collage-like multiple-image footage. In order to continue, he financed production by selling paintings that he owned, and sought backing from anyone he could.

Migrating from Chicago to New York City, and then, at Dennis Hopper's invitation, New Mexico, in 1971 Ray landed in upstate New York, and started a new career as a teacher, accepting an appointment at Harpur College, in Binghamton. There he found a cast and crew, students who were eager and imaginative, but also inexperienced.  Devoted to the idea of learning by doing, Ray and his class embarked on a major, feature-length project.  Rather than the strict division of labour characteristic of his Hollywood career, Ray devised a rotation in which a student would take on different roles behind or in front of the camera.  Similar to the Chicago Seven project—some footage from which he incorporated into the new film—the Harpur film, which came to be titled We Can't Go Home Again, used material shot on numerous gauges of film, as well as video that was later processed and manipulated with a synthesizer provided by Nam June Paik.  The pictures were combined into multiple-image constructions using as many as five projectors, and refilming the images in 35mm from a screen.  Two documentaries provide records of Ray's methods and the work of his class:  the near-contemporary biography, I'm A Stranger Here Myself: A Portrait of Nicholas Ray (1975), directed by David Helpern Jr., and Susan Ray's retrospective account, Don't Expect Too Much (2011).

In the spring of 1972, Ray was asked to show some footage from the film at a conference. The audience was shocked to see footage of Ray and his students smoking marijuana together. An early version of We Can't Go Home Again was shown at the Cannes Film Festival in 1973, to an abiding lack of interest.  Ray shot additional scenes in Amsterdam, shortly after the Cannes screening, in New York in January 1974, and two months later in San Francisco, and edited a second version, with the hopes of attracting a distributor in 1976.  It remained uncompleted and without distribution at Ray's death, in 1979, but some prints of the 1973 version were made and screened at festivals and retrospectives through the 1980s.  A restored version, based on the 1973 cut, was released on DVD and Blu-ray in 2011, by Oscilloscope Films.

In the spring of 1973, Ray's contract at Binghamton was not renewed.  Over the next couple of years, he relocated several times, trying to raise money and continue work on the film, before he returned to New York City.  There, he continued to prepare script materials and try to develop film projects, the most viable of which was City Blues, before the production collapsed.  He was also able to continue teaching acting and directing, at the Lee Strasberg Institute and New York University, where his teaching assistant was graduate student Jim Jarmusch.

Ray directed two short films in the 1970s.  One, The Janitor, was a segment of the feature-length Wet Dreams, also known as Dreams of Thirteen (1974).  Within a collection of shorts, most of which satirized pornography, Ray's was also a very personal film in which he cast himself in the double role of a caretaker and a preacher, and used visual techniques comparable to those in his previous film.  The second, Marco (1978), derived from one of his Strasberg Institute classes and was based on the first few pages of a recent novel of the same name, by Curtis Bill Pepper.  Ray's film was included in the 2011 DVD/Blu-ray release of We Can't Go Home Again.

Having contracted cancer and facing mortality, Ray and his son Tim conceived a documentary about a father-son relationship. That idea, and Ray's hunger to continue working, led to the involvement of German filmmaker Wim Wenders, who had previously employed Ray as an actor, in a small but notable role in The American Friend (1977). Their collaboration, Lightning Over Water (1980), also known as Nick's Film, uses documentary footage and dramatic constructions, juxtaposing film and video.  It charts their passage in making a film, as well as recording events of Ray's last months, including directing a stage scene with actor Gerry Bamman, and directing and acting a scene with Ronee Blakley (then married to Wenders), inspired by King Lear. The film was completed after Ray's death, in June 1979.

Death
Ray was diagnosed with lung cancer in November 1977, though he may have contracted the disease several years earlier.  He was treated with cobalt therapy, and in April 1978 radioactive particles were implanted as treatment.  The next month, he had surgery to remove a brain tumour.  He survived another year, dying of heart failure on June 16, 1979, in New York City. His ashes were buried at Oak Grove Cemetery in La Crosse, Wisconsin.

Directing techniques 
Ray's directorial style and preoccupations evident in his films have led critics to consider him an auteur. Further, Ray is considered a central figure in the development of auteur theory itself.  He was often singled out by Cahiers du cinéma critics who coined the term to designate exemplars (alongside such major figures as Alfred Hitchcock and Howard Hawks) of film directors who worked in Hollywood, and whose work had a recognizable and distinctive stamp seen to transcend the standardized industrial system in which they were produced.  Still, critic Andrew Sarris, among the first to popularize auteurism in the United States, placed Ray below his "Pantheon," and in his second-rung category "The Far Side of Paradise," in his 1968 assessment of sound-era American directors:  "Nicholas Ray is not the greatest director who ever lived; nor is he a Hollywood hack.  The Truth lies somewhere in between."

Acting 
Like many US theatre practitioners of the 1930s, Ray was strongly influenced by the theories and practices of early-twentieth century Russian dramatists, and the system of actor training that evolved into "Method acting."  Late in life, he told students, "My first orientation to the theatre was more toward Meyerholdt, then Vakhtangov, than Stanislavsky," citing Vakhtangov's notion of "agitation from the essence" as being "a principal guideline for me in my directing career."  On a few occasions, he was able to work with actors who were so trained, notably James Dean, but as a director working in the Hollywood studio system, most of his performers were trained classically, on stage, or in the studios themselves.  Some found Ray agreeable as a director, while others resisted his methods.  On Born To Be Bad, for example, Ray started rehearsals with a "table read," then customary in a stage production but less so for a film, and star Joan Fontaine found the exercise discomfiting, tainting her relationship with the director, whom she thought "not right for this kind of picture."  On the same film, Joan Leslie appreciated Ray's hands-on direction, even though they differed in their interpretation of a scene.  Their co-star, the Reinhardt-trained Robert Ryan, remembered favourably his second Ray project, On Dangerous Ground, "He directs very little.... Right from the start of our collaboration, he offered me a very few suggestions. ... He never told me what to do.  He was never specific about anything at all."

Themes and stories 
Most of Ray's films take place in the United States, and biographer Bernard Eisenschitz stresses the distinctively American themes that run through his motion pictures, and Ray's life.  His early work alongside Alan Lomax, as a WPA folklorist and then in radio, and his acquaintance with musicians including Woody Guthrie, Lead Belly, Pete Seeger, and Josh White, informed his approach to American society in his films, and the interest in ethnography evident in his films.  Ray frequently made films characterized by their examination of outsider figures, and most of his movies implicitly or explicitly critique conformity. With examples including They Live By Night and Rebel Without a Cause, he has been cited for his sympathetic treatment of contemporary youth, but other films of his adeptly deal with the crises of more experienced and older characters, among them In A Lonely Place, The Lusty Men, Johnny Guitar, and Bigger Than Life. The stories and themes explored in his films stood out in their time for being non-conformist and sympathetic to or even encouraging of instability and the adoption of then-questionable morals. His work has been singled out for the unique way in which it "define[s] the peculiar anxieties and contradictions of America in the ’50s."

Visual style 
While he started working in Hollywood on film noir and other black-and-white pictures, in the standard Academy ratio, Ray later became better known for his vivid use of color and widescreen. His films have also been noted for their stylized mise en scène with carefully choregraphed blocking and composition that often emphasizes architecture. Ray himself credited his affection for widescreen formats to Frank Lloyd Wright:  "I like the horizontal line, and the horizontal was essential for Wright."  As V. F. Perkins observes, however, many of Ray's compositions "are deliberately, sometimes startlingly, unbalanced to give an effect of displacement," further noting his use of "static masses with bold lines ... which intrude into the frame and at the same time disrupt and unify his compositions."  Bernard Eisenschitz also links Wright to Ray's desire to "destroy the rectangular frame" (as the filmmaker said, adding, "I couldn't stand the formality of it"), through the multiple-image techniques he used in We Can't Go Home Again.  He had envisioned using split-screen techniques as early as Rebel Without a Cause, and proposed, unsuccessfully, that The True Story of Jesse James be "stylized in every respect, all of it shot on the stage, including the horses, the chases, everything, and do it in areas of light."

Ray uses color boldly—Jonathan Rosenbaum, for example, has referred to the "vibrant color-coding" of Johnny Guitar, and the "delirious color" of Party Girl—but meaningfully, determined by the circumstances of the film's story and its characters.  As V. F. Perkins points out, he uses colors "for their emotional effect," but more characteristically "for the extent to which they blend or clash with background."  The reds that Cyd Charisse wears in Party Girl, for instance, "have an autonomous emotional value," but also have impact measured against the "somber browns of a courtroom" or against "the darker red of a sofa on which she sleeps."  Ray himself used the latter example to discuss the varying meaning of color, referring to the red-on-red of James Dean's jacket on a red couch, in Rebel Without a Cause, as "smoldering danger," while the same arrangement of Charisse's gown and sofa "was an entirely different value" (which he did not specify).  In Party Girl, he says, green was "sinister and jealous," while in Bigger Than Life it was "life, grass, and hospital walls," and, referring to the use of color in Johnny Guitar, he cites the costuming of the posse in stark black and white.  Implicitly their dress befits the situation—they have come directly from a funeral—but also situates them in stark contrast to Joan Crawford's Vienna, the character they are persecuting, who changes her wardrobe, in a wide range of vivid colors, from one scene to the next.

About Ray's editing style, V. F. Perkins describes it as "dislocated ... [reflecting] the dislocated lives which many of his characters live," citing as a characteristic feature the use of camera movements that are in process at the start of the shot and not yet at rest at the end.  Frequently, as well, Ray cuts abruptly, and disruptively, from the main action of a scene to the response, in close-up, of "a character who is, to all appearances, only peripherally involved." Another distinctive trait is the frequent use of dissolves for scene transitions, "more than most Hollywood directors of his time," as Terrence Rafferty points out, inferring from this, "perhaps an indication of his general preference for fluidity over hard, nailed-down meanings."  Ray himself cited comic strips as instructive, when he started in pictures, as providing examples that deviated from the most conventional Hollywood editing.  He also remembered that when shooting his first film, the editor (Sherman Todd) encouraged him to "shoot double reverses" (that is, to violate the 180-degree rule), which he did, strategically, in several sequences of They Live By Night, In A Lonely Place, and other of his Hollywood films.

Genre 
Ray distinguished himself by working in nearly every conventionalised Hollywood genre, infusing them with distinctive stylistic and thematic approaches: Crime films, within the film noir cycle:  They Live By Night, In A Lonely Place, and On Dangerous Ground; the social problem film Knock On Any Door; Westerns: Run For Cover, Johnny Guitar, and The True Story of Jesse James; Women's pictures:  A Woman's Secret and Born To Be Bad; World War II dramas:  Flying Leathernecks and Bitter Victory; the family melodrama:  Rebel Without A Cause and Bigger Than Life: Epic spectacles:  King of Kings and 55 Days at Peking.  Yet he also applied himself to films that fell between genres, such as the gangster film, punctuated by dance numbers but not quite a musical, Party Girl, and others of more marginalised categories—the rodeo film The Lusty Men, the ethnographic dramas Hot Blood and The Savage Innocents—or which even predicted more significant, later concerns, such as the ecologically themed drama Wind Across the Everglades.

Personal life

Raymond Nicholas Kienzle Jr. was the youngest child in his family, and the only boy, called "Ray" or "Junior."  His three sisters were significantly older than he:  Alice, born 1900; Ruth, born 1903; and Helen, born 1905.  (He had two half-sisters, from his father's first marriage.  They had both married, but continued to live near their father.)  Raymond Sr. was a building contractor, age forty-eight when his son was born.  After World War I, he retired and moved his family from the small town of Galesville to his own hometown, the larger community of La Crosse, where they would be nearer his mother.  Raymond Sr. loved to read, and he loved music, and so did son Ray, who remembered hearing Louis Armstrong and Lil Hardin, playing on the banks of the Mississippi River, around 1920.  Mother Lena was a Lutheran and teetotaler, but the father drank and frequented speakeasies, and it was in one, when his father went missing in 1927, that Ray tracked down his father's mistress, who led him to a hotel room where Raymond Sr. was insensate; he died the next day.  Ray was sixteen.

As the youngest, Ray had been indulged by his mother and sisters, and now he was the only male in the family.  One by one, though, his sisters left home.  By 1924, Alice had completed training as a nurse, married, and moved to Madison, and, by the time her father died, Oshkosh.  Middle sister Ruth had taken Ray to his first movie, The Birth of a Nation (1915), and she was the first in the family with theatrical ambitions—"stagestruck," as he later characterized her—but they were foiled by the family.  She moved to Chicago and married a scientist, but indulged her love of the arts as an avid audience member.  Helen too had performance in her veins, working awhile reading stories on a children's radio broadcast, then becoming a teacher.

Increasingly unmanageable after his father's death, Ray was sent to Chicago to live with his sister Ruth and enrol in Robert A. Waller High, returning to La Crosse Central midway through his final year.  According to school newspapers and yearbooks, he was popular, with a good sense of humour about himself.  He played football and basketball, and was a cheerleader, perhaps more social activities than athletic commitments. Debate was a greater interest, and he took elocution lessons, and then joined "Falstaff Club," the school's drama group, though not as an onstage presence.  According to biographer Patrick McGilligan, as an adolescent he was "fundamentally restless and lonely," and "prone to long, ambiguous silences."  This was characteristic of conversations with Ray for the rest of his life.  Gifted with a mellifluous, deep voice, however, Ray won a scholarship to be an announcer at the local radio station, WKBH, for a year, while he was enrolled in La Crosse Teachers College.  (Later, he would describe this award as "a scholarship to any university in the world"—a narrative embellishment typical of him.  He reported that the summer following, he joined a troupe of stunt fliers, but also of working with an airborne bootlegger.)

As in high school, he joined the drama society, the Buskin Club, where he also found a girlfriend, Kathryn Snodgrass, daughter of the school president.  They also collaborated as editors on the Racquet, the school newspaper, she on features, and he on sports, and as co-writers of a stage revue revolving around a college student who goes to Hollywood.  The couple was known around campus as "Ray and Kay."  For the revue, titled February Follies, Ray took the stage, as compere.  In April 1930, he advanced to play the lead in the school's major production, of The New Poor, a 1924 comedy by Cosmo Hamilton. In due course, Ray led the Buskins, and started dressing the role of an early twentieth-century aesthete.  As well, he started to offer more left-leaning political commentary in the college paper.  He fostered other proclivities that would persist through most of his life.  After he and Kay Snodgrass broke up, and she transferred to the university in Madison, he courted numerous young women, and balanced insomnia with alcohol-fed socializing all night long.

A hometown friend studying at the University of Chicago had pitched the benefits of his school, especially his classes with Thornton Wilder, who had already impressed Ray when he had seen the writer in La Crosse.  Ray had improved his record and was eligible to transfer in Fall 1931.  He was pledged to a fraternity and played some football, but by his own account he was more committed to the elements of college life that included drinking and pursuing college girls.  As well, he later recounted a homosexual experience, when he was approached by the university's Director of Drama, Frank Hurburt O'Hara (whom Ray does not name), reflecting that his own attitude, more tolerant than usual at that time, "became very helpful to me in understanding and directing some of the actors with whom I've worked."  Ray spent only one quarter at the University of Chicago, and returned to La Crosse in December, resuming enrolment at Teachers College in autumn 1932, where he announced to readers of the school paper that he was "apparently free of amorous entanglements," but also, "I have been known to like a party."  That same year, he and his friend Clarence Hiskey also agitated to start a chapter of the US Communist Party.

As 1932 ended, Ray left college, and, now calling himself Nicholas Ray, sought new opportunities, including, with the help of Thornton Wilder, meeting Frank Lloyd Wright, with the hope of joining Wright's Fellowship at Taliesin.  Lacking the tuition fee, in 1933 Ray ventured to New York City, where, staying in Greenwich Village, he had his first encounters with the city's bohemia.  There, shortly before his stint at Taliesin, Ray met young writer Jean Evans (born Jean Abrahams, later Abrams), and they started a relationship. After he returned east, they lived together, and married in 1936. When Ray took a position at the WPA in Washington, by January 1937 they had moved to Arlington, Virginia. They had one son, Anthony Nicholas (born November 24, 1937), known as Tony, and named for Ray's friend and fellow Federal Theatre director Anthony Mann. Washington government life wore on both Ray and Evans, and Ray's drinking and unfaithfulness strained their marriage. Evans moved back to New York in 1940, having found a job at PM, the new leftist newspaper. Ray returned to New York as well, in May of that year, but soon the couple separated. A few months later he again attempted to reconcile, while also living at Almanac House, a Greenwich Village loft occupied by Pete Seeger, Lee Hays, and Millard Lampell, core members of the Almanac Singers. He committed himself for a time to psychoanalysis, but in time fell back into old habits. Evans filed for divorce in December 1941, and the process was finalized the next summer.

Ray had been rejected for military service on medical grounds, but worked for the Office of War Information (OWI), under John Houseman. There Ray met Connie Ernst, the daughter of lawyer Morris L. Ernst, and a producer of The Voice of America. After his divorce, she and Ray lived together, in New York, from 1942 to 1944, when the OWI sent her to London prior to D-Day, and after she had begun seeing another staff member, Michael Bessie, whom she later married. Ray later wrote, "We had once wanted to marry," though she had remembered his drinking and gambling, commenting, "It was very tricky, being with Nick."

Relocating to Los Angeles to work with Elia Kazan, Ray first lived in a flat at the Villa Primavera, on the corner of Harper and Fountain, that became the model for the apartment building in In A Lonely Place, before moving into a house in Santa Monica. While at Fox, he socialized with fellow transplanted east coasters and theatre folk at Gene Kelly and Betsy Blair's house, among them Judith Tuvim, soon to be known as Judy Holliday, whom he had briefly, unsuccessfully pursued in New York, after his marriage ended. On one occasion, fueled by alcohol, they waded into Santa Monica Bay, an excursion that turned into a halfhearted double suicide attempt, before they changed their minds and struggled back to dry land.

While directing A Woman's Secret, he became involved with the film's co-star, Gloria Grahame, later remembering, "I was infatuated with her but I didn't like her very much." Nonetheless, they married in Las Vegas on June 1, 1948, just five hours after her divorce from her first husband was granted, and five months before the birth of their son, Timothy, on November 12. (RKO announced that he was born "almost four months before the date he was expected.") Tensions in their marriage were known early on, and by autumn 1949, while shooting In A Lonely Place, they had separated for the first time, keeping the split a secret from studio executives. At the end of the year, they announced that they planned to travel to Wisconsin, to spend the holidays with Ray's family there, but he went alone, reuniting with his mother and three sisters, and then on to New York and Boston, to prepare his next project, On Dangerous Ground, and to see his ex-wife and firstborn. In 1950, as that project was ending and as In A Lonely Place was opening, Ray and Grahame were reported to have reconciled, living in Malibu, though their marriage remained dysfunctional. Ray stated that he had discovered Grahame in bed with his son, Tony, who was 13 years old at the time.  Although they were irreparably estranged, Ray and Grahame were nominally connected again, when he was called on to help rescue Macao (1952), a project Josef von Sternberg was directing for RKO. Ray directed additional scenes, but evidently none in which she was featured. Grahame filed for divorce, and she testified in court that Ray had struck her twice, once at a party and once in private, at home, before the divorce was granted, on August 15, 1952. Gloria Grahame and Tony Ray married in 1960 and divorced in 1974. Tony Ray died June 29, 2018, age 80.

The HUAC investigations of Hollywood and the entertainment industry, which largely coincided with Ray's marriage to and divorce from Gloria Grahame, further weighed on him. Fellow RKO employees, such as Edward Dmytryk and Adrian Scott, were among the Hollywood 10, who had been cited for contempt of Congress in the aftermath of the 1947 hearings; Knock On Any Door and In A Lonely Place star Bogart was a charter member of the Committee for the First Amendment, which protested against the hearings; and Ray's old friend Elia Kazan testified confidentially in 1952, first refusing to name names, and later doing so, in order to protect his career. The date and content of Ray's own communication with the committee are unknown (McGilligan reports a gap in Ray's Freedom of Information files, between 1948 and 1963), but his ex-wife Jean Evans remembered that he admitted to her that he testified she "was the one who brought him to the Communist Youth League, which wasn't true at all."

Although he had been wary of therapy, by court order in the divorce, he started seeing psychoanalyst Carel Van der Heide. Even so, he continued womanizing (columnist Dorothy Kilgallen called him "a well-known movie colony heartbreaker") and drinking, both prodigiously. He had romances with both Shelley Winters and Marilyn Monroe, who were roommates at the time, as well as Joan Crawford—with whom he was planning a suspense film, Lisbon, in 1952, and who later starred in Johnny Guitar—and Zsa Zsa Gabor.  More lasting was his relationship with German Hanne Axmann (also known as Hanna Axmann, and later Hanna Axmann-Rezzori), who aimed to start an acting career. She left her troubled marriage to actor Edward Tierney to live with Ray at, by her account, a desultory time for him, of drinking, gin rummy, and analysis that did him little good. While he was preparing Johnny Guitar (which featured her brother-in-law, Scott Brady), Ray asked her to return to Germany, and said he would join her there.  He did not make good on that promise, though they remained in touch and friends for years thereafter.

Johnny Guitar was placed reasonably well on Variety's list of "1954 Boxoffice Champs," increasing his professional capital. By now, he had moved into Bungalow 2 at the Chateau Marmont, his headquarters while shooting Rebel Without A Cause, a project of particular importance to him, about troubled young people.  That was where he pitched his need to make such a film to Lew Wasserman, prompting his agent to send him to Warner Bros.  The hotel residence also became Ray's headquarters and rehearsal space, and it was where James Dean arrived, aiming to meet the director.  Dean started to attend Ray's "Sunday afternoons," his regular gatherings of friends at the bungalow, where scenes of the film to come were starting to take shape.  Natalie Wood remembered Ray's relationship with Dean as "fatherly," and attributed the same quality to Sal Mineo's and her own connection to their director, even though the sixteen year-old also was sexually attracted to him, and his bungalow became the site of their assignations, while she was also involved with supporting player Dennis Hopper. Ray himself was also busy with roommates Monroe and Winters, Geneviève Aumont (then the professional name of Michèle Montau), and even Lew Wasserman's wife, Edie, while also interested in Jayne Mansfield, whom he tested for the role Wood won in Rebel.

Ray and Wood continued their affair for several months after production wrapped, and while he was shooting his next project, Hot Blood (1956), a pregnancy scare, which turned out to be false, prompted her to break off the romance.  Dean had had apprehensions about Ray, but their trust, partnership, and friendship grew, and they talked about forming a production company, collaborating again, and, after Rebel Without A Cause opened, sharing a Nicaragua holiday.  None of those plans materialized, with Dean's death in a car crash, on September 30, 1955, that left Ray devastated and bereft.  On a European tour at the time, he sought comfort with Hanne Axmann, and again in alcohol, in Germany.  According to one friend, Ray had been more moderate for some time, and especially during the summer when he was working on Rebel, but, realizing that the filmmaker was drinking as he was, concluded, "I think it was all over on that September night of 1955."

Some biographers state that Ray was bisexual, alleging his experience at the University of Chicago was the start of his sexual experimentation. Ray denied this in 1977, responding to a question about Ray's use of James Dean's "probable bisexuality" in a sequence of Rebel Without a Cause involving Dean and Sal Mineo.  First, Ray responds that he doesn't understand whether the interviewer is referring to Dean's bisexuality, Mineo's, "or the bisexuality of myself, then states, "I am not bisexual, but anyone who denies having had a fantasy or a daydream denies having eaten a bowl of potatoes, mashed potatoes, you know, it has the same reality."  Returning to Europe, in London, Ray met Gavin Lambert, with whom he had corresponded since Lambert's pioneering positive review of They Live By Night.  Talking about In A Lonely Place, Lambert remembered Ray's comments about Dix Steele, Bogart's character, at the film's end:  "Will he become a hopeless drunk, or kill himself, or seek psychiatric help?  Those have always been my personal options, by the way."  After a night of vodka and conversation, after 3:30 am, Ray and Lambert, who was gay, had sex, and Ray cautioned "that he wasn't really homosexual, not really even bisexual," advising that he had slept with many women, "but only two or three men."  The next day, Ray urged Lambert to accompany him to Hollywood to work on what became Bigger Than Life, and Lambert remained a sometimes-sexual partner, while Ray continued to pursue women.  According to Lambert, Ray "behaved like a possessive lover, expecting me to be always here on call...," while Ray continued to dwell on the loss of James Dean.

Bigger Than Life tells the story of a man who grows reliant on his abuse of medication, and consequently more and more broken.  The connections to Ray, who had grown increasingly dependent on both alcohol and drugs, were not lost, even on Ray.  In 1976, Ray confessed to himself, in a private journal entry, that he had lived in a "continuous blackout between 1957 or earlier until now," and his wife Susan, on seeing the film, commented to her husband, "This is your story before you lived it."  Ray's drug use was abetted, while he was shooting Bitter Victory, by his new girlfriend, a heroin addict named Manon, and his gambling losses led him to a pitiable state that broke his friendship with Gavin Lambert.

Seventeen year-old Betty Utey first crossed paths with Nick Ray in 1951, at RKO, when he was assigned to direct some additional scenes for Androcles and the Lion (1952), including one with a troupe of bikini-clad dancers.  He described it as the "steam room of the vestal virgins."  Some weeks after shooting the scene, in which he featured her, he asked her out to the ballet and dinner, and then took her to the house he was renting, having split with Gloria Grahame. At the end of their evening, like In A Lonely Place, he called a cab and sent her home.  She subsequently did not hear from him for almost three years, when he called her to come to his Chateau Marmont bungalow for an assignation.  He then disappeared again, until 1956, when he called again.  In 1958, she won a place as one of the chorines  in Party Girl, and after shooting ended they eloped to Maine, where Ray hoped to start his third marriage by drying out.  En route, he collapsed at Boston's Logan Airport, suffering from the DTs. He recovered sufficiently to travel on to Kennebunkport, where the couple spent several weeks, before marrying on October 13, 1958. They had two daughters, both born in Rome:  Julie Christina, on January 10, 1960, and Nicca, October 1, 1961.  Ray's mother Lena had died in March 1959.

In early 1963, the family moved from Rome to Madrid, where Ray used money from his Samuel Bronston contract to try to develop projects, which never came to fruition.  With a partner, he opened a restaurant and cocktail lounge called Nicca's, after his younger daughter, and it became the hangout for film people working in Madrid, but also a place for Ray to sink a fortune, reportedly a quarter-million of his dollars in its first year.  To manage it, he hired his nephew, Sumner Williams (whom he had cast in several pictures through the 1950s).  Ray continued his chronic habits:  too many drinks and pills, too little sleep.  He and his wife separated in 1964, and she returned to the US with their children, while he remained in Europe.  They remained married until January 1, 1970, when their divorce was finalised and Betty Ray remarried.

Through the middle of the 1960s, Ray lived peripatetically, setting up in Paris, London, Zagreb, Munich, and, for a while, Sylt, a German island in the North Sea.  He had reacquainted himself with younger son Tim, then at Cambridge, and enlisted him to help with an autobiography—the elder Ray would record his recollections, and the younger would transcribe—for which a publisher had provided an advance, though no such memoir appeared in Nick Ray's lifetime.  Wherever he went, his friends and acquaintances were accustomed to Ray cadging a handout.  "Periodically he stopped drinking," writes Bernard Eisenschitz, "switching to a diet of black coffee, going through stretches without sleep, then crashing for forty-eight hours at a time."  Retrospectives of his films were marking the growth in his reputation, especially outside the US, including a double bill of Johnny Guitar and They Live By Night in Paris, in May 1968, placing Ray and his son amid the political uprising.

He returned to the United States on November 14, 1969, landing in Washington, DC just in time for the second Moratorium to End the War in Vietnam.  Soon after, he announced plans for a documentary about "the young rebels of the 1960s," and relocated to Chicago, to shoot as the trial of the Chicago Eight, soon to become the Chicago Seven, proceeded.  He filmed a party for the defendants and their team the evening of December 3, the day the prosecution ended its case.  Overnight, the Chicago police killed Fred Hampton, Illinois chair of the Black Panther Party, in his sleep, and Ray and his crew were on the scene early in the morning to film the aftermath.

The project had mutated from a documentary to a strange dramatic reconstruction, for which Ray considered casting Dustin Hoffman or Groucho Marx or the long-retired James Cagney, as the trial judge, Julius Hoffman.  According to Ray's own account, in late January 1970, not untypically, Ray was working through the night, and he fell asleep at the editing table, waking to feel a "heavy" sensation in his right eye.  "It took me six hours to find a doctor, and if I had made it twenty minutes sooner, they would have been able to inject nicotinic acid and save the eye."  He was hospitalized from January 28 to February 6, and according to writer Myron Meisel, that was Ray's first treatment for cancer.  Despite this explanation, Ray remained somewhat elusive about the exact cause, and McGilligan notes several possible sources and witnesses to Ray's diminished vision, including a special-effects blast fifteen years previous, while shooting Run For Cover (1955).  After 1970, however, Ray started regularly wearing a key prop in the construction of his mystique.  He was tall, craggy, with a leonine mane of white hair, and now a black patch over his right eye, looking, in the remembrances of his student Charles Bornstein, "like a cross between Noah, a pirate, and God!"

During the trial, Chicago Seven lawyer William Kunstler introduced Ray to Susan Schwartz, an eighteen year-old newly arrived to study at the University of Chicago, who skipped classes to watch the courtroom theatrics.  In February 1970, as the jury deliberated, she found herself in a taxi, on the way to join the hive of activity that surrounded Ray at his house.  "After only one day on Orchard Street," she later wrote, "the decision was easy: at the end of the term I would quit school and join the adventure, whatever it was."  They became companions, and the adventure lasted until the end of Ray's life, and beyond.

They relocated to New York City, where Schwartz worked, in real estate and then publishing, to make a living for both of them while Ray sought money to continue work on the film and start other projects.  They stayed with Ray's old cronies, including Alan Lomax and Connie Bessie, before finding a place of their own, while Ray continued to indulge his addictions and at night haunt the seamier corners of Times Square.  When they crossed paths at a Grateful Dead show at the Fillmore East, Dennis Hopper invited Ray to his house in Taos, New Mexico, where Hopper was editing The Last Movie (1971).  There Ray again found chaos of creativity and debauchery, of a type he had come to thrive upon, at least until the costs of hosting Nicholas Ray—Nicca Ray heard her father ran up a phone bill of $2,500, while Hopper himself likely exaggerated it as $30,000 a month—caused Hopper to ask him to leave.  In Taos, Ray asked Susan to marry him, giving her his ring, and in return she gave him a pearl.

While in New Mexico, in spring 1971 Ray was invited to speak at Harpur College, an academic unit of the State University of New York at Binghamton. The event he presented convinced Larry Gottheim and Ken Jacobs that Ray should join them on faculty in the Cinema Department, then one of the epicenters of experimental film in the US. Appointed on a two-year contract in the fall of 1972, Ray initially lived in an apartment in the university's infirmary. He then rented a farmhouse, and the hours that students spent there, time that he demanded of them, turned it into a communal living and working situation, redolent of his Chateau Marmont bungalow while making Rebel Without A Cause, or, before that, the 1930s New York scene of political theatre and music, though with cannabis and harder drugs (including amphetamines and cocaine) added to alcohol and creativity as fuel.

"There was increasing tension that became animosity," recalled one of the students, principally between Jacobs and Ray.  In part their differences might have stemmed from the different aesthetics of the two artists.  Jacobs and Gottheim worked within the largely non-narrative and to varying degrees poetic and formalist realm of experimental film, while Ray's background was in drama and mainstream narrative cinema. Nonetheless, the project upon which he embarked with his students, envisioned as a feature-length film, first called Gun Under My Pillow (alluding to the character Plato, in Rebel Without A Cause) and finally titled We Can't Go Home Again, might have been seen as consistent with the avant-garde approaches to filmmaking that the department represented.  As well, however, he and Jacobs were both, in the recollection of one student, "extremely strong-willed individuals, with tempers," and they came into conflict, in Gottheim's view, involving "a need for control and loyalty," especially from their students.  There were other points of contention, however, including the monopolization and abuse of the department's filmmaking equipment by Ray's project and student crew, as well as Ray's drug and alcohol habits and his students' emulation of him.  As department chair, Gottheim had mediated the friction between his colleagues, but in spring 1973 Jacobs became acting chair, escalating the conflict; shortly thereafter, Ray's contract was not renewed. Jacobs would later characterize hiring Ray as a "calamitous error."

Ray's goal was to work on We Can't Go Home Again, in order to screen it at the Cannes Film Festival, in May 1973. Leaving Binghamton, followed by a few students who drove the film's elements across country in a driveaway car, he travelled wherever he might find cheap or free editing facilities, money to continue the project, and friends who would tolerate him as a guest. He started in Los Angeles, where he wound up back in Bungalow 2 at the Chateau Marmont, running up bills and seeking investment from his old Hollywood connections. But it was Susan who managed to find the money to get them both, and the film, to France. Ray's reputation in Europe might have helped secure a screening slot at Cannes, but it failed to convince the press and any other festivalgoers that the film warranted notice.

At loose ends, Ray and Susan spent some time in Paris, borrowing money from his longtime champion François Truffaut and racking up hotel costs paid by writer Françoise Sagan.  Susan returned to New York, and Ray stayed awhile on a boat owned by Sterling Hayden, his "Johnny Guitar," from almost twenty years before.  Ray travelled to Amsterdam, shooting a segment, The Janitor, for the feature-length Wet Dreams (1974), a softcore anthology produced by Max Fischer.  He returned to New York by the end of the year, but in March 1974 he went back west, to the San Francisco Bay Area.  The purpose was a retrospective of his films at the Pacific Film Archive, but he came with boxes of footage and personal goods, intending to stay awhile.  He lived in a spare room at archive curator Tom Luddy's residence and worked overnight shifts in the editing rooms of Francis Coppola's Zoetrope facility, and, after he wore out that welcome, at the film collective CIne Manifest.  While in the area, Ray was taken to hospital twice, once for alcoholic haemorrhaging.  The first time, Luddy called Tony Ray to tell him of the fear that Ray would die, and Ray's son declined to do anything, and the second time, Luddy similarly called John Houseman, who happened to be in the area, meeting a similar dismissal.

Later in 1974, Ray returned to Southern California, to stay with his ex-wife Betty and their daughters, Julie, now fourteen, and Nicca, almost thirteen, whom he had not seen since they left Spain, ten years previous.  "It was like seeing a man who had been emptied out," Betty recalled.  She arranged for a house where he could stop drinking, but soon determined that he needed medical supervision and had him admitted to the detoxification unit at Los Angeles County Hospital.  Ray resumed using, however, even persuading his older daughter to buy cocaine for him.  On his departure, he left a letter advising that "it is best I live apart from you and our children," for many reasons, ending, "above all others I can bring you no joy."

He attended Sal Mineo's funeral, in February 1976, and, shortly after, he returned to New York City, where he was offered the opportunity to direct a film starring Marilyn Chambers and Rip Torn, which Ray titled City Blues, but financing fell through by July 1976, and the project never materialised.  He continued to drink and abuse drugs heavily, and found himself in and out of hospital, with a variety of maladies and injuries due to impairment.  Finally, Susan left him, and, on professional advice, gave him the ultimatum that she would not return unless he checked in to the Smithers Alcoholism and Rehabilitation Center, and was sober for one month.  Shortly after, he had himself admitted.  He remained for ninety days, and was discharged early in November 1976.  He started attending Alcoholics Anonymous meetings, and he and Susan moved into a Soho loft, at 167 Spring Street.

In early 1977, Ray started to realize some new opportunities.  In March, Wim Wenders cast him in a small but notable role, alongside Dennis Hopper, in The American Friend (1977).  At the same time, with the support of old friends Elia Kazan and John Houseman, he started to present workshops on acting and directing at the Lee Strasberg Theatre Institute, and then at New York University.  He was also approached about directing a couple of films, including The Story of Bill W., about the founder of Alcoholics Anonymous.  In November 1977, however, he was diagnosed with lung cancer.  Surgery showed that the tumour was too close to his aorta to be safely removed, so he received cobalt therapy.

He had travelled to California in summer 1977, taking Betty and Nicca to dinner, and leaving his daughter a letter that caused her to "start believing that Nick understood me better than Betty ever would."  He returned west in February 1978 to play a bit part in Miloš Forman's Hair (1979).  Where he had looked robust in The American Friend, he now looked gaunt and drawn.  After his scenes were shot, he visited Houseman in Malibu, and he summoned Nicca, so that he could tell his daughter that he was dying of cancer.  They remained in contact, and though she hoped to travel to New York, it was the last time they saw each other.

On April 11, 1978, Ray underwent additional surgery, at Memorial Sloan-Kettering Cancer Center, involving therapeutic implantation of radioactive particles.  Then on May 26, he had surgery again, to remove a tumour on his brain.  He was frail and coughed painfully, he had lost his mane of hair, yet he was still active, hired to teach another summer workshop at NYU.  He was then invited by László Benedek—once Ray's contemporary, as a Hollywood director, now chair of the NYU graduate film program—to teach in the autumn.  He assigned Ray a teaching assistant, soon to become a friend, Jim Jarmusch.

With the imminent prospect of his death, Ray had spoken with his son Tim about making a documentary about a father-son relationship.  Though that project remained unpursued, Tim Ray, experienced in cinematography, joined the crew that assembled to make Lightning Over Water, a collaboration of Ray and Wenders, though credited collectively to all the participants.  With no appetite, and increasingly unable to swallow, Ray was wasting away, and had to be admitted to hospital for intravenous feeding, restoring some weight and buying some time.  Ray was visited by friends including Kazan, Connie Bessie, Alan Lomax, and his first wife, Jean, as well as students from Harpur College, and his more recent students.

Ray died in hospital, of heart failure, on June 16, 1979.  A memorial was held at Lincoln Center shortly after.   Among the attendees were all four of his wives and all four of his children. He was survived by two sisters, Helen and Alice (Ruth had died in a fire, in 1965), and his ashes were returned to La Crosse, Wisconsin, his hometown, and interred in the same section of Oak Grove Cemetery as his parents.  His grave bears no inscription.

Influence
In the decades after his professional peak, and since his death, filmmakers continue to cite Ray as an influence and object of admiration.

 As a critic, Victor Erice has commented on Ray's films with great affection, also collaborating with Jos Oliver on a catalogue for a 1986 retrospective, Nicholas Ray y su tiempo. Erice was also interviewed about We Can't Go Home Again for the documentary, Don't Expect Too Much.  Asked to comment on any continuities between Ray's work and his own filmmaking in 2004, however, he demurred, though he has also remarked on a connection between his film El Sur (1983), and Rebel Without a Cause.
 Jean-Luc Godard wrote in his review of Bitter Victory: "There was theatre (Griffith), poetry (Murnau), painting (Rossellini), dance (Eisenstein), music (Renoir). Henceforth there is cinema. And the cinema is Nicholas Ray." In addition, Godard's films abound in references and allusions to Ray's films. In Godard's film, Contempt (1963), the character played by Michel Piccoli claims to have written Ray's Bigger Than Life, and in La Chinoise (1967) a young Maoist defends the politics of Johnny Guitar to his anti-American colleagues.  Johnny Guitar is also one of the film titles used as code names by the "Front de libération de Seine et Oise" guerillas in the concluding sequence of Weekend (1967).  Referring to Ray and Samuel Fuller, Godard dedicated Made in U.S.A. (1966), "À Nick et Samuel qui m'ont élevé dans le respect de l'image et du son." ["To Nick and Samuel who taught me with respect to image and sound."]  Godard had seen some of Ray's multiple-image work, Ray affirmed, before Godard's ventures into the format, with Numéro deux (1975) and Ici et ailleurs (1976).
 Director Curtis Hanson discusses In a Lonely Place in a documentary supplement included on the 2003 Columbia DVD release, and later also included on the 2016 Criterion Collection Blu-ray release. Ray's film was one of many influences on his direction of L.A. Confidential (1997).
 Jim Jarmusch, having been Ray's teaching assistant at NYU, has spoken on several occasions of the lessons he's learned, citing two in particular.  Comparing making a film to assembling a "string of beads," Ray urged the aspiring filmmaker when shooting one scene not to think of any of the other "beads."  With this principle, Jarmusch learned the value of shooting out of sequence and of shooting a film's final scene last, a recommendation he remembers receiving from both Ray and Fuller.  Ray also told Jarmusch that he gave actors notes separately, reasoning that each actor brings individual thoughts and ideas to a scene.  Jarmusch, however, also allowed that, in working with actors, Ray would use "psychological games" and other manipulative tactics, "...things that I personally would never do." From Ray's work, Jarmusch claims that he learned to be attentive to everything that's seen in a film, while also cautioning, "I never would ever compare myself in any way to Nick...."  More broadly, Jarmusch cited Ray's personal impact, affirming, “He gave me a sense of myself, in a way.”  Jarmusch's first feature, Permanent Vacation (1980), includes a scene set in the St. Mark's Cinema, where a The Savage Innocents poster is hanging, and the protagonist asks the popcorn seller about the picture.  His 2013 film, Only Lovers Left Alive, revives the title of an unmade Ray project.  The stories are unrelated, but a photo of Ray is evident in one scene.
 Martin Scorsese admires Ray's work, particularly his expressionistic use of color in Johnny Guitar, Rebel Without a Cause, and Bigger Than Life (1956). He used clips from two of them in his documentary A Personal Journey with Martin Scorsese Through American Movies.
 François Truffaut wrote reviews of several Ray films for the Paris weekly Arts/Spectacles in the 1950s, some later adapted for his book, Les Films de ma vie (The Films of My Life). He asserts that They Live by Night (1949) is Ray's best movie, but gives special attention to his films Bigger Than Life and Johnny Guitar.  Truffaut also appears as an interview subject in the 1975 documentary about Ray, I'm a Stranger Here Myself.  
 Wim Wenders is another European admirer of Ray's and has paid homage to him in many movies. Some of his films are indebted to Ray, from the title of his science fiction film Until the End of the World (which were the last spoken words in Ray's biblical epic King of Kings) to the casting of Dennis Hopper (who appeared in Rebel Without a Cause) and the expressionistic use of colour in his own film The American Friend. He gave Ray a small but key role in the film: an artist, presumed dead, who forges his own work. He also co-directed Ray's final film, the experimental documentary Lightning Over Water, and edited it after Ray's death. The film is a touching portrait of the final days of Nicholas Ray's life.

Filmography (director)

Films

Other work

Filmography (actor)

References

Further reading
 
 
 
 Sancar Seckiner's book South (Güney), contains an essay, "Reminders of Ray's Century", which highlights aspects of Nicholas Ray' life. .

External links
 
 
 Nicholas Ray at Senses of Cinema: Great Directors Critical Database
 Photos of Nicholas Ray during the making of We Can't Go Home Again
 The New Yorker article
 Nicholas Ray: The Last Interview with Kathryn Bigelow and Sarah Fatima Parsons
 Nicholas Ray Foundation

1911 births
1979 deaths
Deaths from lung cancer in New York (state)
American people of German descent
People from La Crosse, Wisconsin
People from Galesville, Wisconsin
Western (genre) film directors
Binghamton University faculty
Film directors from Wisconsin
People of the United States Office of War Information
La Crosse Central High School alumni
Bisexual men
LGBT film directors
Federal Theatre Project people